The Embassy of Cambodia in Washington, D.C. is the diplomatic mission of the Kingdom of Cambodia to the United States of America. It is located at 4530 16th Street Northwest, Washington, D.C. in the  Crestwood neighborhood.

Chum Sounry is the current Cambodian Ambassador to the United States, and was appointed to the role in 2018.

See also
Cambodia – United States relations

References

External links
Official website 

Cambodia
Washington, D.C.
Cambodia–United States relations